Tommy Sands (born 19 December 1945) is a Northern Irish folk singer, songwriter, radio broadcaster, and political activist. He performs with his three siblings as The Sands Family; solo as Tommy Sands; and with his son and daughter as Tommy Sands with Moya and Fionán Sands. Tommy was the prime songwriter for The Sands Family, one of Ireland's most influential folk groups of the 1960s and '70s.

Tommy Sands has hosted Country Céilí, a radio show on Downtown Radio in Newtownards since 1976.

His song "There Were Roses" has been described as "... certainly one of the best songs ever written about the "Irish Problem"".

In May 2002 he received an Honorary Doctorate from the University of Nevada, Reno for his outstanding work as musician and ambassador for peace and understanding. May 18 of each year has been proclaimed Tommy Sands Day in Reno.

Early life
Tommy Sands was born on the family farm on the 'Ryan Road' in the townland of Ryan, near Mayobridge, County Down, Northern Ireland. His parents, Mick and Bridie, both came from families of singers, musicians and storytellers and encouraged a love of Irish culture and tradition in their seven children (Mary, the eldest, then Hugh, Ben, Colum, Eugene and Anne.) . His father Mick (known to all as 'The Chief') and six uncles played the fiddle. His mother Bridie, an accordionist, is the daughter of 'Burren poet', Owen Connolly, and her mother was related to the Brontë family. Their Céilidh house on the Ryan Road, in the foothills of the Mourne Mountains, was a focal point for Catholic and Protestant neighbours from nearby farms to enjoy music and craic.

Sands initially attended college to study theology and philosophy, but dropped out and began to walk the 120 miles home to concentrate on his music career. Along the way a car filled with his siblings picked him up to perform at a concert. Colum rolled down the window and said: “We’re going to play at a concert. We’ve got your guitar in the back of the car.” So Tommy joined them. He and they have never looked back! ('Newry Memoirs – Pride of Mayobridge')

The Sands Family

The Sands Family (Tommy, Eugene, Ben, Colum and Anne) started public performing in local halls and pubs, then they won a 'Folk Group' contest in "Old Shieling Hotel" in Raheny, Dublin. This led to a three-week booking in New York in early 1971 (or 1970) followed by further tours in the US and Canada. They also performed a Saint Patrick's Day concert appearance in Carnegie Hall.

Their 35-year touring career includes regular tours throughout continental Europe, especially Germany, as well as the UK and Ireland. One notable highlight was performing in Moscow's Luzhniki 'Olympic' Stadium, Tommy was the prime songwriter with the Sands Family, whose repertoire largely consists of their own compositions as well as traditional Irish songs.

During the 1975 'Sands Family' tour of Germany Tommy's brother Eugene was killed in a road accident. 'Dino' played banjo and mandolin.

Since the early 2000s the Sands Family have restricted touring to an annual tour of Germany and Ireland.

Solo career

Tommy Sands' iconic and best known song is "There Were Roses" that recounts how Allan Bell (name changed), a Protestant friend of Sands, was murdered in Newry by republican paramilitaries.  In the aftermath loyalist paramilitaries "prowled round the Ryan Road" for a Catholic to kill in retaliation; ironically, the man they selected, Sean O'Malley (name changed), had been a good friend of the Protestant victim and also of Sands. It was first recorded by Robbie O'Connell with Mick Moloney and Jimmy Keane as the title track on their first album. Tommy Sands also recorded his own version as the opening track of his 1985 album Singing of the Times.

The song has also been recorded by Joan Baez, Kathy Mattea, Dolores Keane, Sean Keane, Frank Patterson, Paddy Reilly, Dick Gaughan, The Dubliners, Cara Dillon, Lisa McHugh and many others. It has also been translated into many languages and is currently included in the English language syllabus in German secondary schools.

In Belfast, during the depths of The Troubles in August 1986, Sands organised a "Citizen's Assembly" which included many of Ulster's top artists and literary figures.

In December 2002 Sands persuaded the Members of the Northern Ireland Assembly to record a special 'Christmas musical party' for his weekly radio show. As many Members sang with him on stage David Ervine, the leader of the Loyalists remarked "Tommy Sands is the only man, without a private army, who can intimidate me." The radio show received a special award at the "World Festival of TV and Radio" in New York.

In September 2008 Tommy Sands was invited to perform at the Library of Congress with his daughter Moya and son Fionán, as part of the Rediscover Northern Ireland Program. The event was co-sponsored by the Arts Council of Northern Ireland and the American Folklife Center.

In June 2010 Sands accepted the invitation of Palestinian and Israeli activists conducting a joint campaign at the neighbourhood of Sheikh Jarrah in East Jerusalem, to come and perform at a rally held to protest Israeli settlers evicting Palestinian Sheikh Jarrah residents and taking over their homes.

Discography

The Sands Family recordings

Solo recordings

Other work
Sands co-wrote the stage musical, The Shadow of O'Casey with Shivaun O'Casey, the daughter of playwright Seán O'Casey.

Tommy Sands has hosted Country Ceili, a radio show on Downtown Radio in Belfast since 1976 (or August 1977).

In 2005 he published his autobiography, The Songman – A Journey in Irish Music.

Personal life
Tommy Sands currently lives in Rostrevor with his French wife Catherine. They have two children, Moya and Fionán, with whom Tommy now performs.

References

Further reading
 The Songman – A Journey in Irish Music by Tommy Sands. (2005)
 Tommy Sands songbook Published by Elm Grove Music, 50 Shore Road, Rostrevor, Co Down, BT34 3AA, N. Ireland.

External links

Tommy Sands Official website
The Sands Family Official website

1945 births
Living people
Irish folk singers
Irish male singers
Radio presenters from Northern Ireland
People from Mayobridge
Musicians from County Down
Green Linnet Records artists